Pleurotomella anomalapex is a species of sea snail, a marine gastropod mollusk in the family Raphitomidae.

Description
The length of the shell attains 7.8 mm.

Distribution
This marine species occurs off the Falkland Islands and Patagonia; off the South Sandwich Islands and the Scotia Sea.

References

 Powell, Arthur William Baden. Antarctic and subantarctic mollusca: Pelecypoda and Gastropoda. Vol. 26. University Press, 1951.

External links

 Kantor Y.I., Harasewych M.G. & Puillandre N. (2016). A critical review of Antarctic Conoidea (Neogastropoda). Molluscan Research. 36(3): 153-206
 

anomalapex
Gastropods described in 1951